Pomi is a commune of 2,365 inhabitants situated in Satu Mare County, Romania. It is composed of four villages:

References

Communes in Satu Mare County